Vilappil  is a village in Thiruvananthapuram district in the state of Kerala, India.

Demographics
At the 2001 India census, Vilappil had a population of 34,079 with 16,740 males and 17,339 females.

References

Villages in Thiruvananthapuram district